The Fifteenth Legislative Assembly Election was held on 16 May 2016 for the 232 seats (except Thanjavur and Aravakurichi for which held on 26 October 2016) of the Legislative Assembly in the state of Tamil Nadu in India. AIADMK under J. Jayalalithaa won the elections and became the first ruling party to be re-elected in Tamil Nadu since 1984, though with a simple majority. DMK won half of the seats it contested but its allies performed poorly; notably, the Indian National Congress won 16% of the seats they contested and the alliance lost due to its poor performance. The votes were counted on 19 May 2016. In the previous election in 2011, AIADMK, under the leadership of Jayalalithaa, won a thumping majority and formed the government, while DMDK chief Vijayakanth served as the Leader of Opposition until January 2016. This was the last election that J. Jayalalithaa and M. Karunanidhi contested, as they both died in 2016 and 2018 respectively.

Background
By the requirement, state assembly election must be held at an interval of five years or whenever it is dissolved by the president. The previous election, to the 14th legislative assembly, was conducted 13 April 2011 and its term would have naturally expired on 22 May 2016. The election to the 16th legislative assembly was organised and conducted by the Election Commission of India (ECI) and was held in a single phase on 16 May 2016. There were over 5.79 crore voters in the electoral rolls and 65,616 polling stations in Tamil Nadu.

A special purification drive of electoral rolls between 15 and 29 February 2016 in all poll-bound States including Tamil Nadu was held, in which door-to-door verification was undertaken involving booth-level agents. On 12 February 2016, Election Commission of India announced that 17 assembly constituencies in Tamil Nadu will have Voter-verified paper audit trail (VVPAT) machines attached along with EVMs. Voter-verified paper audit trail (VVPAT) machines will be in place in 4,000 booths.

Demographics
At the 2011 India census, Tamil Nadu had a population of 7,21,47,030. A total of 1,44,38,445 people constituting 20.01% of the total population belonged to Scheduled Castes (SC) and 7,94,697 people constituting 1.10% of the population belonged to Scheduled tribes (ST). Other Backward Classes (OBCs) form 68% of the population. As per the religious census of 2011, Tamil Nadu had 87.6% Hindus, 5.9% Muslims, 6.1% Christians, 0.1% Jains and 0.3% following other religions or no religion.

Schedule
The elections were held on 16 May 2016, with vote counting taking place on 19 May. The elections in Kerala and Puducherry also took place on 16 May but polling in two of the Tamil Nadu constituencies was postponed due to reports of voters being bribed.

Campaign to vote
To ensure that the electorate exercise their right to vote, the Election Commission of India (ECI) launched their own campaign in Tamil Nadu. The Chief Electoral Officer for the Tamil Nadu assembly elections, Rajesh Lakhoni, utilised social media platforms by creating memes and tweets themed around films, which have a huge reach in Tamil Nadu. Additionally, the Election Commission also recruited media personalities Suriya, Ashwin and Karthik, whose campaigning videos were filmed and shared on social media. The Election Commission also partnered with Twitter, for the first time in India, to boost its #TN100Percent hashtag campaign. Twitter users who have made use of the hashtag will be reminded to vote on the day of voting. Twitter and Facebook collaborated with ECI in its awareness campaign on striving for 100 per cent voting in the polls.

Parties and Alliances

AIADMK Alliance
All the parties contested on "two leaves" symbol as an AIADMK candidate.

DMK Alliance

Makkal Nala Kootani (People's Welfare Alliance)

National Democratic Alliance

Parties not in any coalition

Candidates
On 4 April, AIADMK released its candidate list for Tamil Nadu. On 14 April, DMK released its candidate list for Tamil Nadu.

Gopi Shankar Madurai, a 25 years old gender activist made a bid to contest as one of the youngest candidates in the Tamil Nadu Assembly election and also the first openly Intersex & Genderqueer person to do so. Gopi contested on the ticket of newly launched outfit Anaithu Makkal Munnetra Kazhagam (AMMK) for Madurai North. He secured 14th place out of 21 candidates.

Manifestos
DMK released its election manifesto on 10 April 2016. Bharatiya Janata Party released its election manifesto on 21 April 2016. On 23 March 2016, Naam Tamilar Katchi published its 316-page election manifesto 2016, a complete plan to develop Tamil Nadu. Tamil Nadu Congress Committee released its election manifesto on 27 April 2016. Pattali Makkal Katchi released its draft election manifesto on 15 September 2015 and final election manifesto on 15 April 2016. AIADMK released its election manifesto on 5 May 2016.

Voter Turnout
Voter turnout for the 232 constituencies on 16 May was 74.81%. Parts of Tamil Nadu received heavy rain on the polling day, but it did not deter voters from turning out to cast their votes. While the highest voter turn out was in Dharmapuri constituency recording 85% while the lowest voter turnout was in the capital of Tamil Nadu, Chennai recording 55%. Male voter turnout was 74.15% and female voter turnout was 74.33%.

Exit polls

Results
The ruling AIADMK, beating most of the exit polls, was able to retain power with a comfortable majority and became the first party to win consecutive elections since 1984, a feat achieved by M. G. Ramachandran. Jayalalithaa bucked Anti-incumbency trend and cyclic change of governments in the state that hadn't voted back a government in last three decades.

|-style="background-color:#E9E9E9"
! style="vertical-align:bottom;text-align: center;" rowspan=2 colspan=2|Parties and Coalitions !!  style="vertical-align:bottom;text-align:center;" width="60" rowspan=2|Votes !! style="vertical-align:bottom;text-align:center;" rowspan=2|% !! style="text-align:center;" colspan=3|Seats
|-style="background-color:#E9E9E9"
! style="text-align:center;"|Contested !! style="text-align:left;"|Won !! style="text-align:center;"|+/-
|-
| style="background-color:"|  || style="text-align:left;"|All India Anna Dravida Munnetra Kazhagam (AIADMK)|| 17,806,490 || 40.88% || 234 || 136 || 14
|-
| style="background-color:"|  || style="text-align:left;"|Dravida Munnetra Kazhagam (DMK) || 13,670,511 || 31.39% || 178 || 89 || 66
|-
| style="background-color:"|  || style="text-align:left;"|Indian National Congress (DMK)|| 2,774,075 || 6.47% || 41 || 8 || 3
|-
| style="background-color:"|  || style="text-align:left;"|Indian Union Muslim League (DMK)  || 313,808 || 0.73% || 5 || 1 || 1
|-
| style="background-color:"|  || style="text-align:left;"|Pattali Makkal Katchi || 2,302,564 || 5.36% || 234 || 0 || 3
|-
| style="background-color:"|  || style="text-align:left;"|Bharatiya Janata Party || 1,235,660 || 2.86% || 234 ||  0 || 
|-
| style="background-color:"|  || style="text-align:left;"|Desiya Murpokku Dravida Kazhagam (PWF) || 1,037,431 || 2.41% || 105 ||  0 || 29
|-
| style="background-color:"|  || style="text-align:left;"|Independents || 617,907 || 1.44% ||  234 || 0 || 
|-
| || style="text-align:left;"|Naam Tamilar Katchi  || 460,089 || 1.07% || 234 || 0 || 
|-
| style="background-color:"|  || style="text-align:left;"|Marumalarchi Dravida Munnetra Kazhagam (PWF) || 373,713 || 0.87% ||  28 || 0 || 
|-
| style="background-color:"|  || style="text-align:left;"|Communist Party of India (PWF) || 340,290 || 0.79% || 25 || 0 || 9
|-
| style="background-color:"|  || style="text-align:left;"|Viduthalai Chiruthaigal Katchi (PWF) ||331,849 || 0.77% || 25 || 0 || 
|-
| style="background-color:"|  || style="text-align:left;"|Communist Party of India (Marxist) (PWF) || 307,303 || 0.72% || 25 || 0 || 10
|-
| style="background-color:"|  || style="text-align:left;"|Tamil Maanila Congress (PWF) || 230,711 || 0.54% || 26 || 0 || 
|-
| || style="text-align:left;"|Puthiya Tamilagam (DMK) || 219,830 || 0.51% || 4 || 0 || 2
|-
| style="background-color:"|  || style="text-align:left;"|Manithaneya Makkal Katchi  || 197,150 || 0.46% ||  4  || 0 || 2
|-
| || style="text-align:left;"|Kongunadu Makkal Desia Katchi ||  167,560 || 0.39% || 72 || 0 || 
|-
| style="background-color:"|  || style="text-align:left;"|Bahujan Samaj Party  || 97,823 || 0.23% || n/a || 0 || 
|-
| style="background-color:"|  || style="text-align:left;"|Social Democratic Party of India || 65,978 || 0.15% || n/a || 0 || 
|-
| style="background-color:"|  || style="text-align:left;"|None of the above  || 5,65,077 || 1.31% ||  234 || – || –
|- class="sortbottom" style="background-color:#E9E9E9; font-weight:bold"
| colspan=2 style="text-align:left;"|Total || 4,35,56,184 || 100.00 || - || 234 || -
|-
! colspan="9" |
|-
| style="text-align:left;" colspan="2" |Valid votes
| align="right" |4,35,56,184
| align="right" |99.93
| colspan="4" rowspan="5" style="background-color:#E9E9E9"  |
|-
| style="text-align:left;" colspan="2" |Invalid votes
| align="right" |29,507
| align="right" |0.07
|-
| style="text-align:left;" colspan="2" |Votes cast / turnout
| align="right" |4,35,85,691
| align="right" |74.81
|-
| style="text-align:left;" colspan="2" |Abstentions
| align="right" | 1,46,74,574
| align="right" |25.19
|-
| style="text-align:left;" colspan="2" |Registered voters
| align="right" | 5,82,60,506
|colspan="1" style="background-color:#E9E9E9"|
|-
|}
Election to two assembly constituencies were cancelled by the Election Commission on confirmed reports of bribing voters in Aravakurichi and Thanjavur. Elections were held later there on 26 October 2016

Results by constituency

Detailed Analysis & Performance of political parties

Controversies
On 3 May, News 7 and Dinamalar released an opinion poll giving an edge for DMK over AIADMK. But some editions of Dinamalar carried a statement on the first page distancing itself from the surveys. In an instance VVPAT was helpful in resolving an issue pertaining to a tally of votes in Kancheepuram Assembly constituency as the number of votes entered in the Form 17C of a polling booth and the total number of votes recorded in the EVM control unit of that booth did not tally.

Cash for votes
Wide spread allegations of parties bribing voters with cash were raised and the Election commission responded by increasing the number of flying squads to conduct raids and prevent distribution of cash for votes. First time in the Indian history Rs 570 crores of three containers captured in Tirupur, no one claimed for that money at the first day. Later SBI claimed that money. Many parties like CPI(M), CPI, VCK, MDMK, PMK, wanted clear information about that money.

Postponement of polls
The Election Commission postponed the polls in Aravakurichi and Thanjavur constituencies due to reports of distribution of huge sums of money and alcohol to voters. The polling was initially postponed to 13 June, despite the Governor of Tamil Nadu requesting that it should happen before 1 June. The date was subsequently amended to November.

By-Election
On 26 October 2016, the Election Commission announced that the election for Thiruparankundram, Aravakurichi and Thanjavur constituencies would be held on 19 November 2016. The outcome was:

22 by election results

See also
Elections in India
2016 elections in India

References

External links
Chief Electoral Officer, Tamil Nadu
Election Commission of India

TAMILNADU
2016
2016
May 2016 events in India